The 2017 TCR Italy Touring Car Championship is the third season of the ITCC to run under TCR regulations and the 31st season since a national touring car series was revived in 1987 as the Campionato Italiano Turismo.

Teams and drivers 
Hankook Tire is the official tire supplier.

Calendar and results
The previous schedule for 2017 was announced on November 24, 2016, but on February 16, 2017 a new calendar was announced with changes of dates and with all the events scheduled to be held in Italy.

Drivers' championship

Scoring systems

One point for pole position and one point for fastests lap.

TCR Standing

† – Drivers did not finish the race, but were classified as they completed over 75% of the race distance.

TCT Trophy

† – Drivers did not finish the race, but were classified as they completed over 75% of the race distance.

TCR Constructors Standing 

† – Drivers did not finish the race, but were classified as they completed over 75% of the race distance.

References

External links
 

2017 in Italian motorsport
Italy Touring Car Championship